Alexander Myller (1879–1965) was a Romanian mathematician and professor at the Alexandru Ioan Cuza University of Iași.

References

Romanian mathematicians
1879 births
1965 deaths
Academic staff of Alexandru Ioan Cuza University
Titular members of the Romanian Academy